Robert Steadman (born 1 April 1965) is a British composer
of classical music who mostly works in a post-minimalist style but also writes lighter music, including musicals, and compositions for educational purposes. He also teaches, writes articles for music education journals, notably Classroom Music, and has written several revision guides for GCSE Music and A-level Music Technology.

Background 

Steadman was born in Chiswick, London, and brought up in Basingstoke, Hampshire. He was a pupil at Richard Aldworth School, before studying on the Pre-Professional Music Course at Cricklade College, Andover. In 1984 he gained an Associate of the Royal College of Music (A.R.C.M.) in tuba.

He read music at Keble College, Oxford, graduating in 1986. During his time at Oxford, Steadman was the musical director of many shows and, notably, became President of the Oxford Revue working with Armando Iannucci and John Sparkes.

Compositions 
While much of his output has been written for amateurs and young musicians he has also written several pieces of music for the percussionist Evelyn Glennie, for the Royal Philharmonic Orchestra, for the London Brass Virtuosi, for saxophonist Sarah Field and for the East of England Orchestra (now Sinfonia ViVA). He has written three symphonies and two operas, but is best known for his choral compositions. He has also written many chamber music pieces, including those for the Holywell Ensemble. One of his anthems was used at the memorial service for the Dunblane Massacre.

Teaching
Steadman was banned from classroom teaching in England for five years, by The National College for Teaching and Leadership professional conduct panel after it was found he had engaged in an inappropriate relationship with a student while teaching part-time at Lady Manners School in Bakewell.

Discography 
The Rains are Coming (1997)
Nottingham Songbook (2000)
Kintamarni (2003)

Bibliography
Robert Steadman Lifelines: AQA GCSE Music (Rhinegold Publishing)
Chris Duffill & Rob Steadman.Lifelines: Edexcel AS Music Technology (Rhinegold Publishing)
Chris Duffill & Rob Steadman.Lifelines: Edexcel A2 Music Technology (Rhinegold Publishing)

References

External links 
Robert Steadman's website

1965 births
Living people
Steadman,Robert
20th-century classical composers
21st-century classical composers
English opera composers
Male opera composers
Alumni of Keble College, Oxford
People from Basingstoke
People from Chiswick
English male classical composers
20th-century English composers
20th-century British male musicians
21st-century British male musicians